Eversleigh Campbell Freeman (2 January 1893 – 30 June 1973) was a Canadian racewalker. He competed in the men's 10 kilometres walk at the 1920 Summer Olympics and the 1924 Summer Olympics.

References

1893 births
1973 deaths
Athletes (track and field) at the 1920 Summer Olympics
Athletes (track and field) at the 1924 Summer Olympics
Canadian male racewalkers
Olympic track and field athletes of Canada
Emigrants from British Jamaica to Canada
People from Saint Andrew Parish, Jamaica